Christos Talichmanidis (born 16 March 2001) is a Greek professional footballer who plays as a goalkeeper for Super League club PAOK.

Club career

Early career

He never once hesitated about the position he wanted to play. He always desired to be a goalkeeper. Inwardly perhaps, it was because of his father. Christos Talichmanidis pulled on his gloves at the age of 10 at the Pavlos Melos academy, and in only his second year there he became the leader of the mixed team of Macedonian Football League Championship. In 2013 he joined PAOK, apparently to stay.

Talichmanidis is tall and strong, and a player with special talent, characterised by his ability to play his way out of trouble with the ball at his feet. At the same time, he is a player with a strong, but humble personality. As a youngster he was a key member of the Under-14s MFCA championship-winning side of the 2014–15 season, and he played an influential role in the Under-15s title win, as well as the Under-17s title success in the 2017–18 season. At the age of 17 he became a member of PAOK's Under-19s, with whom he celebrated two league championships and also enjoyed two extremely interesting seasons playing in the UEFA Youth League. At the age of 18, he enrolled in the Department of Accounting and Finance at the University of Macedonia.

As for what is etched in his memory? «I remember everything, but what I will never forget and what was extra special is the game against Barcelona,» he said. Yes, both Talichmanidis and Christos Tzolis celebrated that famous 2–1 against Barcelona in Spain in January 2014 as members of PAOK's Under-12 side.

PAOK
The peak so far came in the summer of 2019, when Talichmanidis took part in the senior side's pre-season training. And that is where he is right now, seemingly with a bright future ahead.

Honours

Club
PAOK
Greek Cup: 2020–21

References

2001 births
Living people
Greek footballers
Greece youth international footballers
Super League Greece 2 players
Super League Greece players
PAOK FC players
Association football goalkeepers
Footballers from Thessaloniki
PAOK FC B players